G. Spencer Coggs (born August 6, 1949) is an American public administrator and Democratic politician.  He is the current Milwaukee City Treasurer, since April 2012.  He previously served 10 years in the Wisconsin State Senate and 20 years in the Wisconsin State Assembly, representing Milwaukee's west side.

Early life, education and career
Coggs was a City of Milwaukee health officer (and Chief Steward of his AFSCME union local), postal worker and industrial printer.

Wisconsin legislature
Coggs was elected to the Wisconsin State Assembly for what was then the 10th district in 1982 and reelected until 2002. During his time in the assembly he was the Majority Caucus Vice Chairperson in 1985, 1987 and 1989.

He was elected in 2003 to the state senate in a special election and reelected in 2004 and 2008.  He sat on the Committee on Housing and Financial Institutions, and Joint Committee for Review of Criminal Penalties.

Coggs was vice president of the National Labor Caucus of State Legislators.

2011 Wisconsin protests

During the protests in Wisconsin, Coggs, along with the 13 other Democratic State Senators, fled the state to deny the State Senate a quorum on Governor Scott Walker's controversial "Budget Repair" legislation.

Running for other offices 
Coggs announced December 22, 2009, that he was running for the position of Lieutenant Governor of Wisconsin in 2010. (Current Lt. Gov. Barbara Lawton was not seeking a third term.) On September 14, he lost the Democratic nomination in a four-way race, with fellow legislator Tom Nelson winning an absolute majority (52%) over Coggs' 21% and two other candidates with smaller percentages.

In February 2012, Coggs was one of two State Senators (the other being fellow Democrat Tim Carpenter) to win a place on the ballot for Milwaukee City Treasurer in the Spring 2012 election, defeating former State Treasurer Dawn Marie Sass (like Coggs, a former AFSCME activist) and Socialist Rick Kissell in the non-partisan primary. Coggs polled 13,559 votes; Carpenter 12,880; Sass 5,089 and Kissell 2,241. In the general election, Coggs won with 35,096 votes to Carpenter's 34,293.

After he was sworn in as Treasurer in mid-April, Coggs announced that he would not be resigning his position as Senator until a new Senator could be elected. "With us in the state Senate tied 16–16, it just makes sense for me to keep my position. If I were to leave, I'm not saying my Republican friends would cause mischief, but I don't want to give them any temptation," he stated. He said that he would donate his second salary to an as-yet-unnamed charity. Two incumbent Assembly Democrats, his cousin Elizabeth Coggs and Sandy Pasch, had already announced that they would be running for the vacant seat (although Pasch later changed her mind). In the end, he was succeeded in the Senate by another Democrat, Nikiya Harris.

References

External links
Senator Spencer Coggs at the Wisconsin State Legislature
constituency site
 
6th Senate District, Senator Coggs in the Wisconsin Blue Book (2005–2006)
Campaign 2008 campaign contributions at Wisconsin Democracy Campaign

1949 births
African-American state legislators in Wisconsin
City and town treasurers in the United States
Living people
Milwaukee Area Technical College alumni
Politicians from Milwaukee
University of Wisconsin–Milwaukee alumni
Democratic Party Wisconsin state senators
21st-century American politicians
American Federation of State, County and Municipal Employees people
21st-century African-American politicians
20th-century African-American people
Democratic Party members of the Wisconsin State Assembly